Nikolai Golyushev (9 December 1929 – 23 November 2021) was a Russian opera singer. He was honored as the People's Artist of the RSFSR (1980).

References 

1929 births
2021 deaths
Russian opera singers
People from Kaslinsky District
People's Artists of the RSFSR